Dolichomia is a genus of snout moths in the subfamily Phycitinae. It was described by Émile Louis Ragonot in 1891. It is mostly treated as a synonym of Hypsopygia or Herculia, which in turn is also mostly treated as a synonym of Hypsopygia. Others sources retain it as a valid genus however.

Species
 Dolichomia amoenalis (Möschler, 1882) 
 Dolichomia binodulalis (Zeller, 1872) - pink-fringed dolichomia moth
 Dolichomia craspedalis (Hampson, 1906) 
 Dolichomia datames (Druce, 1900) 
 Dolichomia decetialis (Druce, 1900) 
 Dolichomia graafialis (Snellen, 1975) 
 Dolichomia impurpuratalis (Dognin, 1910) 
 Dolichomia nigrapuncta (Kaye, 1901) 
 Dolichomia olinalis (Guenée, 1854) 
 Dolichomia phanerostola (Hampson, 1917) 
 Dolichomia planalis (Grote, 1880) 
 Dolichomia plumbeoprunalis (Hampson, 1917) 
 Dolichomia resectalis (Lederer, 1863) 
 Dolichomia thymetusalis (Walker, 1859) - spruce needleworm moth
 Dolichomia vernacularis (Berg, 1874)

References

Pyralini
Pyralidae genera
Taxa named by Émile Louis Ragonot